Mary Theresa Wiedefeld (February 2, 1886 – November 1983) was the seventh president (formerly principal) of State Teachers College at Towson (now Towson University).

Wiedefeld was a graduate of Towson and had many roles in Maryland public education, from grade-school teacher to State Supervisor of Elementary Schools. Wiedefeld was president during World War II when enrollment declined and employees were hard to obtain. Under her administration, the college developed a special program for cadet teachers to help alleviate the teacher shortage, took the first steps toward preparing teachers for junior high and kindergarten and inaugurated a junior college program in the arts and sciences.

Presidents of Towson University
1983 deaths
1886 births
People from Baltimore
20th-century American academics
Towson University alumni